Canada issued revenue stamps from 1864 to 2005. In addition to national issues, the provinces of Alberta, British Columbia, Manitoba, New Brunswick, Newfoundland, Nova Scotia, Ontario, Prince Edward Island, Quebec (Lower Canada), Saskatchewan and Yukon as well as Cape Breton, Halifax, Morden, Saskatoon and Winnipeg also had their own stamps.

See also
Postage stamps and postal history of Canada

References

External links
An Introduction to Canadian Revenue Stamps - Christopher D. Ryan
Tax Stamps Collection

Philately of Canada
Taxation in Canada
Canada